Chatchai Saengdao (born 11 January 1997) is a Thai professional footballer who plays as a centre back for Thai League 1 club Muangthong United.

Honours

International
Thailand U-23
 2019 AFF U-22 Youth Championship: Runner up

References

External links
 
 

1997 births
Living people
Chatchai Saengdao
Chatchai Saengdao
Association football defenders
Chatchai Saengdao
Chatchai Saengdao
Chatchai Saengdao
Chatchai Saengdao
Chatchai Saengdao
Chatchai Saengdao
Chatchai Saengdao
Competitors at the 2019 Southeast Asian Games
Chatchai Saengdao